Colombe may refer to:

People
 Alain Colombe (born 1949), French slalom canoeist
 Anne Félicité Colombe (fl. 1793), French printer and political activist
 Georges-Henri Colombe (born 1998), French rugby union player
 Jean Colombe (1430–1493), French painter and manuscript illuminator
 Lodovico delle Colombe (1565–1623), Italian Aristotelian scholar
 Michel Colombe (1430–1513), French sculptor
 Philippe Colombe (died 1722), Safavid artillery commander of French origin
 Colombe Jacobsen-Derstine (born 1977), American chef and actress
 Louis Saint Ange Morel, chevalier de la Colombe (1755–1825), French army officer

Places
 Colombe, Isère, France, a commune
 La Colombe, Loir-et-Cher, France, a former commune
 La Colombe, Manche, France, a commune

Arts and entertainment
 Colombe (play), a 1950 play by Jean Anouilh
  La colombe, an 1860 play by Charles Gounod
 "Une colombe", a 1984 Celine Dion song
 "La Colombe", a song by Jacques Brel
 Dove (Picasso), a 1949 lithograph by Pablo Picasso

Other uses
 French brig Colombe (1795)
 La Colombe Coffee Roasters, an American coffee roaster and retailer

See also
 Colombe-lès-Vesoul, Haute-Saône, France
 Colombé-la-Fosse, Aube, France
 Colombé-le-Sec, Aube, France
 Garde-Colombe, Hautes-Alpes, France
 Colombes, Paris, France, a city
 Sainte-Colombe (disambiguation)
 Coulombe, a surname
 Colom (disambiguation)